Serena is an unincorporated community and census-designated place in LaSalle County, Illinois, United States. Serena has a post office with ZIP code 60549. Serena was the residence of Peg McDonnell Breslin, the first woman elected to the Illinois Appellate Court outside Cook County.

Geography 

Demographics 
As of the 2020 census there were 129 people, 4 households, and 4 families residing in the CDP. The racial makeup of the CDP was 89.92% White, 2.33% African American, 0.78% Native American, 2.33% Asian, and 4.65% from two or more races. Hispanic or Latino of any race were 6.20% of the population.

References

Unincorporated communities in Illinois
Unincorporated communities in LaSalle County, Illinois
Ottawa, IL Micropolitan Statistical Area